This is a list of Brazilian television related events from 1966.

Events

Debuts

Television shows

Births
13 June - Adriana Colin, model, TV host & journalist
13 November - Fernando Rocha, journalist & TV host

Deaths

See also
1966 in Brazil